The 1970 FIFA World Cup final was held on Sunday, 21 June, in the Estadio Azteca in Mexico City, to determine the winner of the 1970 FIFA World Cup. This final, between Brazil and Italy, marked the first time that two former world champions met in a final; Italy had previously won the World Cup in 1934 and 1938, while Brazil won in 1958 and 1962.

Before the finals in Mexico, Brazil had to play qualifying matches against Colombia, Venezuela and Paraguay. Brazil was far superior, winning all six games, scoring twenty-three goals and conceding only two. In the last match of the qualifying round, Brazil beat Paraguay 1–0 and had the largest official audience ever recorded for a football match, with 183,341 spectators in Brazil's Maracanã Stadium. In total, the Brazilian team won all 12 games, scoring 42 goals and conceding only 8.
 
With this third win after their 1958 and 1962 World Cup victories, Brazil became the world's most successful national football team at that time, surpassing both Italy and Uruguay, who each had two championships. The third title earned Brazil the right to retain the Jules Rimet Trophy permanently; it was stolen in 1983 while on display in Rio de Janeiro and never recovered. Thirty-eight-year-old Brazilian coach Mário Zagallo became the first footballer to win the World Cup as a player (1958, 1962) and a coach, as well the second youngest coach to win a World Cup, after Alberto Suppici in 1930. Pelé ended his World Cup playing career as the competition's first three-time winner.

Match

Summary

Brazil struck first, with Pelé heading in a cross by Rivellino at the 18th minute. Roberto Boninsegna equalized for Italy after a blunder in the Brazilian defence. In the second half, Brazil's firepower and creativity was too much for an Italian side that clung to their cautious defensive system. Gérson fired in a powerful shot for the second goal, and then helped provide the third, with a long free kick to Pelé who headed down into the path of the onrushing Jairzinho. Pelé capped his superb performance by drawing the Italian defence in the centre and feeding captain Carlos Alberto on the right flank for the final score. Carlos Alberto's goal, after a series of moves by the Brazilian team from the left to the centre, is considered one of the greatest goals ever scored in the history of the tournament.

A total of seven outfield players from Brazil passed the ball until captain Carlos Alberto hammered the ball into the corner of the Italian goal following a pass across the Italian penalty area from Pelé, prompted by Tostão, who, with his back to the goal, told Pelé that Alberto was steaming in on the right flank. Tostão started the move five yards from the left of the Brazilian penalty area, then ran the length of the field to the Italian box without touching the ball again to tell Pelé to lay it off for Alberto. The players involved in the passes in order were Tostão, Brito, Clodoaldo, Pelé and Gérson. Clodoaldo beat four Italian players in his own half before passing to Rivellino who hit a perfect pass down the wing to Jairzinho. Jairzinho crossed from the wing to the centre of the box to Pelé who held the ball up to play a pass for Alberto to smash it home. The only outfield players not involved in the move were Everaldo and Piazza. In 2002, the UK public voted the goal as number 36 in the list of the 100 Greatest Sporting Moments.

Details

See also
Brazil–Italy football rivalry

References

Final
1970
1970
1970
Final
Final
Brazil–Italy relations
Sports competitions in Mexico City
1970s in Mexico City
June 1970 sports events in North America